George L. Cox (1878–1947) was an American actor and film director.

Selected filmography
 The House of Toys (1920)
 The Gamesters (1920)
 The Week-End (1920)
 The Thirtieth Piece of Silver (1920)
 A Light Woman (1920)
 The Blue Moon (1920)
 Sunset Jones (1921)
 Payment Guaranteed (1921)
 Their Mutual Child (1921)

References

Bibliography
 Goble, Alan. The Complete Index to Literary Sources in Film. Walter de Gruyter, 1999.

External links

1878 births
1947 deaths
American film directors
American male film actors